Chhalla Mud Ke Nahi Aaya is a 2022 Indian Punjabi-language historical drama film directed by Amrinder Gill, written by Amberdeep Singh, and co-produced by Rhythm Boyz Entertainment and Amberdeep Films. It stars Amrinder Gill, Binnu Dhillon, Sargun Mehta, Karamjit Anmol and Amrit Waraich. The film is based on the hardships faced by Chhalla from pre-partitioned Punjab who goes to Canada in search of work and financial stability.  It marked the feature film directorial debut for Amrinder Gill.

The film was released theatrically at cinemas on 29 July 2022, and generally received positive reviews from critics.

Synopsis
The film is based in Pre-Partition Punjab. The story revolves around Chhalla (Amrinder Gill) who goes to Canada to find financial stability. He along with his friend Gama face many hurdles to earn and send money back to their families, as they struggle to earn equal pay as white labourers and face discrimination.

Cast 
 Amrinder Gill as Chhalla 
 Sydney Eberwein as Bella
 Karamjit Anmol as Najjar
 Sargun Mehta as Jeeto (cameo appearance)
 Binnu Dhillon as Gamma (cameo appearance)
 Amrit Waraich as Tara Singh
 Raj Kakra as Fauji
 Harpreet Bains as Sukho
 Gary Dehlon as Hazaara
 Bikram Brar as Munshi

Release
The trailer for the film was released on 23 July and the film was released on 29 July 2022.

Music
Music for the film is provided by Lowkey and Rhythm Boyz Entertainment.

Track list

Reception

Box office
Challa Mud Ke Nahi Aaya  opened at (#7) with A$505,449 in Australia and at (#6) with NZ$94,635 in New Zealand. In North America, the film grossed  $665,000 in the opening weekend, with high figures in Toronto, Winnipeg and Vancouver. In United Kingdom, it grossed £48,464 in the opening weekend.

Critical reception
Shital of The Tribune gave three stars out of five and said, "Humour, emotion, great storyline and definitely a worthy climax, Chhalla Mud Ke Nahi Aaya scores on every front." Kiddaan describes the film as "a heartwarming film with emotions and an inspiring message. The film’s concept will surely connect to the people who have left their homes to earn a living" and gave it 4 out of 5 stars. Sukhpreet Kahlon of Cinestaan gave three stars out of four, and said, "Chhalla Mud Ke Nahi Aaya is an ambitious film in its scope and its attempt to narrate this historical struggle is commendable. There are several elements that are praiseworthy. A lot of care has been taken to bring out the historical era through sets, costumes and production design. The dialogues are witty, the humour is entertaining, and the camaraderie amongst the workers is heart-warming. There is even a social message woven in for equality and gender rights. However, the story lags in the middle, especially with Chhalla’s return to the village where the film seems to forget what happens in Canada. It is the sweeping scope of the film that is its undoing as it tries to pack in too many things. Nonetheless, the climax is powerful and a testimony to the valour and hard work of early Sikh migrants. One wishes that the narrative was tighter and more focused to truly make this a compelling film […] This is an important piece of history. One that deserves to be told."

Notes

References

External links 

 

Punjabi-language Indian films

Films set in the British Raj
Indian historical drama films
2020s Punjabi-language films
2022 drama films
2022 films
Films set in Canada